Lane Poole Reserve is a protected area in Western Australia.

The reserve protects native forests and woodlands, and includes a stretch of the Murray River, one of the few undammed rivers in this part of Western Australia, with natural waterfalls and rock pools along its length.

Flora and fauna
Lane Poole Reserve is in the Jarrah Forest bioregion, also known as the Southwest Australia woodlands.

There are about 500 native species of plants in the reserve. Plant communities include jarrah forest, which are tall open forests of jarrah (Eucalyptus marginata) and marri (Corymbia calophylla), including areas of old growth forest. Wandoo woodlands are found in the eastern side of the park. Wildflowers fill the forests and woodlands in spring. The densely-vegetated Taxandria swamp thickets provide habitat for quokka (Setonix brachyurus) and the noisy scrub-bird (Atrichornis clamosus).

Threatened marsupials in the reserve include the quokka, woylie (Bettongia penicillata), western ringtail possum (Pseudocheirus occidentalis), and chuditch (Dasyurus geoffroii). Native birds include Baudin's black cockatoo (Zanda baudinii) and Carnaby's black cockatoo (Zanda latirostris).

Recreation
There are nine campsites in the reserve, including Baden Powell, Nanga Mill, Stringers, Charlie's Flat,  Tony's Bend, Chudich, Nanga Brook, Nanga Townsite, and Yarragil. Nanga Road provides a sealed road to Nanga Townsite from Nanga Gate. Icy Creek Environmental Education Camp (built in 1984) offers built accommodation for students and community groups. 

The  Bibbulmun Track passes through the reserve.

Other recreational activities include canoeing and kayaking on the Murray River, and fishing on the Murray River and its tributaries.

Conservation
Lane Poole Reserve was designated in 1987. It combined six previous reserves, and a management plan was approved in 1990. Only one or two roads in the area are sealed, and a Conservation and Land Management (CALM) issues paper identified this as a matter to be rectified, along with the overuse of non-designated campsites, visitor behaviour and safety, dogs in the reserve, and firewood collection.

The reserve was named for Charles Lane Poole, the state’s first Conservator of Forests, who did much to establish sustainable management and conservation of Western Australia’s forests.

The larger portion of the reserve is designated a 5(1)(g) reserve. Four smaller areas, totalling , are designated a conservation park. Under the CALM Act, land designated as 5(1)(g) Reserve is land vested in the Conservation and Parks Commission of Western Australia that is not a National Park, Conservation Park, Nature Reserve, Marine Park or Marine Nature Reserve. Such land may have a wide variety of purposes, but are normally related to recreation, wildlife conservation, infrastructure and historical features.

References

External links

 Lane Poole Reserve. Parks and Wildlife Service, Government of Western Australia.

Protected areas of Western Australia
Peel (Western Australia)
South West (Western Australia)
Darling Range
Jarrah Forest